X Movement (Movimento X, MX), later Project For – X Movement (Progetto Per - Movimento X), is a populist political party in Italy founded in 2014 by some senators expelled from the Five Star Movement. The leader of the party is the former Senator Laura Bignami, while the national spokesperson is Giampaolo Sablich, her husband and former city councilor of Busto Arsizio.

The party is inspired by the Spanish Podemos party.

MX was launched in July 2014 by four senators who had left (or had been expelled from) the Five Star Movement (M5S), a populist party which had come first in the 2013 general election, over disagreements with Beppe Grillo's and Gianroberto Casaleggio's leadership, but did not want to team up with the already-existent Italy Work in Progress.

During 2015 Bartolomeo Pepe left the party in order to join, along with Paola De Pin (another ex-M5S senator formerly affiliated to Italy Work in Progress), the Federation of the Greens,
 while Maurizio Romani left to join Italy of Values. Maria Mussini left later, leaving Laura Bignami as the party's only senator.

In 2021 Laura Bignami was a candidate for mayor of Busto Arstizio with the support of the X Movement, but she scored just 1.6% of the vote.

References

External links
Official website

2014 establishments in Italy
Political parties established in 2014
Political parties in Italy
Five Star Movement breakaway groups